Édouard Roger-Vasselin was the defending champion but decided not to participate.
Vasek Pospisil defeated Igor Sijsling in the final 7–6(7–2), 6–4.

Seeds

Draw

Finals

Top half

Bottom half

References
 Main Draw
 Qualifying Draw

Challenger Banque Nationale de Granby
Challenger de Granby